Syncopacma zonariella is a moth of the family Gelechiidae. It was described by Walsingham in 1905. It is found in Algeria.

The wingspan is about 16 mm. The forewings are black, sparsely sprinkled with pale ochreous scales, which are slightly grouped in the fold a little beyond its middle and on the disc above and beyond. At the outer third of the wing-length is a straight, clearly defined, pale ochreous fascia, its outer edge somewhat jagged. The hindwings are grey, with a brownish tinge.

References

Moths described in 1905
Syncopacma